Presenting Isaac Hayes is the debut studio album by American soul musician Isaac Hayes. The album was released in 1968, by Enterprise and Atlantic Records. The LP was the first release on Stax Records' Enterprise label; Hayes had for several years served as one of Stax's key songwriters, producers, and studio musicians.

Recorded to appease Stax vice president Alvertis Isbell (Al Bell), Presenting features Hayes recording with Booker T. & the MGs members Al Jackson, Jr. and Donald "Duck" Dunn as a jazz trio. No material was prepared for the sessions, so the three musicians improvised an album's worth of material.

"Precious, Precious", recorded as an 18-minute jazz piece, was edited to under three minutes for release as a single. Both the 45 and the album under-performed, and Hayes would only continue his recording career after Stax lost its entire backlog to Atlantic Records during the process of breaking away from Atlantic. The lack of material necessitated all Stax artists — Hayes included — to record albums for release, resulting in Hayes' successful and groundbreaking Hot Buttered Soul (1969).

Following Hayes' success with Hot Buttered Soul, in 1971 Black Moses and the Shaft soundtrack, Atlantic reissued Presenting Isaac Hayes under the title In the Beginning.

Track listing

Personnel 
Isaac Hayes - vocals, piano
Donald "Duck" Dunn  - bass guitar
Al Jackson Jr. - drums
Technical
Arif Mardin, Steve Cropper - mixing
Alvertis Isbell - supervision
Bill Kington, API Photographers - photography
Loring Eutemey - cover design

References

1968 debut albums
Isaac Hayes albums
albums produced by Al Bell
Albums produced by Donald "Duck" Dunn
albums produced by Al Jackson Jr.
Stax Records albums
Atlantic Records albums